The Pilot 35 is an American sailboat that was designed by Sparkman & Stephens as a racer-cruiser and first built in 1962.

Production
The boat was designated as Sparkman & Stephens design #1727 and was intended as fiberglass boat especially for Henry R. Hinckley & Company (Hinckley Yachts), who built the design in Southwest Harbor, Maine, United States. A total of 117 examples of the design were completed between 1962 and 1975, but it is now out of production. Some sources say 13 were completed as yawls while others state 25.

Five boats were delivered with a custom raised cabin "dog house".

About 12 boats were built under licence in South America for use by the Chilean Navy.

Design
The Pilot 35 is a recreational keelboat, built predominantly of fiberglass, with teak wood trim above decks. It has a  masthead sloop rig or optional mizzen mast and yawl rig, with aluminum spars. It features a spooned raked stem, a raised counter transom, a keel-mounted rudder controlled by a wheel and a fixed long keel. A tall rig for sailing in areas with lighter winds was also optional, with a mast about  taller. It displaces  and carries  of lead ballast.

The below decks woodwork is of Philippine mahogany, with the cabin sole made from holly. Sleeping accommodation consists of a private bow cabin with a "V"-berth, a main cabin with opposite settee berths, plus optional berths mounted above the settee berths, for a total of six berths. The galley is a split design, with the two-burner, alcohol-fired stove and oven and sink to port and the refrigerator to starboard, the top of which serves as a navigation station. The head is located just aft the bow cabin and has a hanging locker opposite. Pressurized water is provided for both the head and galley.

For sailing, winches are provided for the jib as well as halyard winches. The mainsheet is aft, sheeted from the end of the boom. There are stainless steel genoa tracks and the standing rigging is also stainless steel. The toerails, handrails and the long, sweeping cockpit coaming, as well as all other topside trim parts, are all made from teak wood.

The design has a Portsmouth Yardstick racing average handicap of 81.

Operators
Chilean Navy - about 12 boats.

See also
List of sailing boat types

Similar sailboats
C&C 34/36
C&C 35
Cal 35
Cal 35 Cruise
Goderich 35
Hughes 36
Hughes-Columbia 36
Island Packet 35
Landfall 35
Mirage 35
Niagara 35
Southern Cross 35

References

Keelboats
1960s sailboat type designs
Sailing yachts
Sailboat type designs by Sparkman and Stephens
Sailboat types built by Hinckley Yachts